The Association of Tennis Professionals (ATP) Tour is the elite tour for professional tennis organized by the ATP. The ATP Tour includes the Grand Slam tournaments (organized by the International Tennis Federation (ITF)), the ATP Championship Series, Single-Week, the ATP Championship Series, the ATP World Series, the ATP World Team Cup, the Davis Cup (organized by the ITF), the ATP Tour World Championships and the Grand Slam Cup (organized by the ITF).

Schedule 
This is the complete schedule of events on the 1995 ATP Tour, with player progression documented from the quarterfinals stage.

Key

January

February

March

April

May

June

July

August

September

October

November

December

ATP rankings

Statistical information 
Players and singles titles won, listed in alphabetical order:
  Andre Agassi - Australian Open, San Jose, Miami Masters, Washington, D.C., Canadian Masters, Cincinnati Masters, New Haven (7)
  Boris Becker - Marseille, Season-Ending Championships (2)
  Alberto Berasategui - Oporto (1)
  Arnaud Boetsch - Toulouse (1)
  Michael Chang - Hong Kong, Atlanta, Tokyo Indoors, Beijing (4)
  Francisco Clavet - Palermo (1)
  Albert Costa - Kitzbühel (1)
  Jim Courier - Adelaide, Scottsdale, Tokyo Outdoors, Basel (4)
  Filip Dewulf - Vienna (1)
  Slava Doseděl - Santiago (1)
  Yahiya Doumbia - Bordeaux (1)
  Stefan Edberg - Doha (1)
  Thomas Enqvist - Auckland, Philadelphia, Pinehurst, Indianapolis, Stockholm (5)
  Wayne Ferreira - Dubai, Munich, Ostrava, Lyon (4)
  Javier Frana - Nottingham (1)
  Paul Haarhuis - Jakarta (1)
  Mauricio Hadad - Bermuda (1)
  Yevgeny Kafelnikov - Milan, Saint Petersburg, Gstaad, Long Island (4)
  Richard Krajicek - Stuttgart Indoors, Rotterdam (2)
  Ján Krošlák - Tel Aviv (1)
  Karol Kučera - Rosmalen (1)
  Nicolás Lapentti - Bogotá (1)
  Todd Martin - Memphis (1)
  Patrick McEnroe - Sydney (1)
  Andrei Medvedev - Hamburg Masters (1)
  Fernando Meligeni - Båstad (1)
  Carlos Moyà - Buenos Aires (1)
  Thomas Muster - Mexico City, Estoril, Barcelona, Monte Carlo Masters, Rome Masters, French Open, St. Poelten, Stuttgart Outdoors, San Marino, Umag, Bucharest, Essen Masters (12)
  David Prinosil - Newport (1)
  Marcelo Ríos - Bologna, Amsterdam, Kuala Lumpur (3)
  Marc Rosset - Nice, Halle (2)
  Greg Rusedski - Seoul (1)
  Pete Sampras - Indian Wells Masters, London, Wimbledon, US Open, Paris Masters (5)
  Sjeng Schalken - Valencia (1)
  Gilbert Schaller - Casablanca (1)
  Martin Sinner - Copenhagen, Johannesburg (2)
  Carl-Uwe Steeb - Moscow (1)
  Michael Stich - Los Angeles (1)
  Bohdan Ulihrach - Prague, Montevideo (2)
  Todd Woodbridge - Coral Springs (1)

The following players won their first title:
  Albert Costa - Kitzbühel
  Filip Dewulf - Vienna
  Slava Doseděl - Santiago
  Paul Haarhuis - Jakarta
  Mauricio Hadad - Bermuda
  Ján Krošlák - Tel Aviv
  Karol Kučera - Rosmalen
  Nicolás Lapentti - Bogotá
  Patrick McEnroe - Sydney
  Fernando Meligeni - Båstad
  Carlos Moyà - Buenos Aires
  David Prinosil - Newport
  Marcelo Ríos - Bologna
  Sjeng Schalken - Valencia
  Gilbert Schaller - Casablanca
  Martin Sinner - Copenhagen
  Bohdan Ulihrach - Prague
  Todd Woodbridge - Coral Springs

See also 
 1995 WTA Tour

References

External links 
 Association of Tennis Professionals (ATP) official website
 1995 ATP Tour draws

 
ATP Tour
ATP Tour seasons